The 2018 Melbourne Storm season was the 21st in the club's history. They competed in the 2018 NRL season and did so as the reigning Premiers and Minor Premiers. The team was coached by Craig Bellamy, coaching the club for his 16th consecutive season. Melbourne Storm was also captained by Cameron Smith, who has been the sole captain for the team since 2008 — making it his 11th consecutive season.
In 2018, the club celebrated its 20th Anniversary, which was launched on 30 October 2017 with the announcement that a new logo would feature for the duration of the 20 year celebrations including on a newly designed jersey.

At the conclusion of the 2018 NRL regular season, the Storm finished on 34 competition points (equal to the Sydney Roosters in first place), the Storm ultimately finished second due to having a slightly inferior points difference (by 8 points) and therefore missed winning the Minor Premiership, the second-placed finish, however, ensured a home final in Week 1 of the finals series. The Storm won both their Qualifying final and Preliminary finals qualifying them for their third straight Grand Final however they were ultimately beaten in the decider and therefore finished the season runners up.

Season summary 

 2018 World Club Challenge – The Melbourne Storm commenced their season by competing in the annual World Club Challenge against the 2017 Super League premiers Leeds Rhinos, the match was under a cloud until on 3 November 2017 it was announced that it would be played in Australia at AAMI Park due to the disruptions to the Storm preseason caused by the 2017 Rugby League World Cup. The Storm prevailed 38-4 to become World Club Champions and in doing so became the fifth Australian team to hold the treble (Premiership, Minor Premiership and World Club Challenge at once). It was the first World Club Challenge in Australia since 2014 and only the fourth in history.
 23 February – Over 20,000 fans brave torrential rain to attend the trial match between the Storm and the North Queensland Cowboys at Suncorp Stadium in Brisbane. The "A Night with Cam and JT" match billed as a testimonial to Storm captain Cameron Smith and Cowboys captain Jonathan Thurston raises money for a variety of charities. Thurston set up the winning try in the final minute to take a 16–14 win.
 2 March – Melbourne Storm announce their team of the first 20 years during a celebratory night at Crown Palladium. The 17-man line-up is made up of the greatest players to have pulled on the purple jersey over the last two decades.
 Round 1 – Melbourne Storm open the season with a victory over the Canterbury-Bankstown Bulldogs at the new Optus Stadium in Perth. The win marked the 16th consecutive season that the club has won their opening game of the season, and also this was their 11th consecutive victory making this their equal 4th best winning streak. Sam Kasiano also made his Storm debut. 
 Round 2 – Hampered by a high error count, Melbourne's winning streak comes to an end losing 10–8 to the Wests Tigers in Billy Slater's 300th NRL game. Kenny Bromwich also played his 100th NRL game.
 Round 3 – In the 2017 NRL Grand Final rematch against the Cowboys, Melbourne return to the winner's list in a 30–14 victory.
 Round 4 – Melbourne are held tryless in a 14–4 loss to Cronulla, as referees Alan Shortall and Matt Cecchin take the NRL's penalty crackdown to the extreme in calling 33 penalties, including sending Cameron Smith to the sin bin for the first time in his career. 
 Round 5 – Played as a double-header at Mount Smart Stadium in Auckland, Wests Tigers again frustrate Melbourne into a tight 11–10 loss. The match was Craig Bellamy's 400th as coach, and Ryan Hoffman's 250th game for the club in his third spell in Melbourne. The two wins and three losses from the first five games, was Melbourne's worst start to a season since 2004, with the club dropping out of the top eight on the NRL ladder for the first time since 2014.
 Round 6 – Led by doubles to ers Josh Addo-Carr and Suliasi Vunivalu, Storm return to the winners list with a 40–14 win over Newcastle Knights.
 Round 8 – Storm score a 40-point win over the second placed New Zealand Warriors to retain the Michael Moore Trophy, with Cameron Smith scoring nine goals from as many attempts.
 Round 9 – Josh Addo-Carr scores all three of Melbourne tries in a 30–14 loss to the ladder-leading St George Illawarra Dragons. Papua New Guinea centre Justin Olam makes his first grade debut.
 Round 10 – Cameron Smith was charged with dangerous conduct in a tackle on former Storm player Kevin Proctor with Smith taking an early guilty plea in taking a one-match suspension.
 Round 11 – Curtis Scott becomes the first player sent off in a NRL game since 2015, and the first Storm player since 2011, for repeatedly punching Manly's Dylan Walker in a brawl between the pair. Scott would later be suspended for two matches by the NRL Judiciary. Manly would win the game 24–4 with officials mistakenly sending two Manly players back on to the field from the sin bin before their penalties had expired.
 Round 12 – Sam Kasiano and Dale Finucane both play their 150th NRL games in a 7–6 win over the Cowboys. Cameron Munster slotting the first field goal of his career to secure the win, after Cameron Smith scored a try in his return from suspension.
 30 May – Young Tonumaipea announces he will leave the club to take up Mormon missionary work in Germany.
 Round 14 – Melbourne rally from a 12–2 first half deficit to take a 32–16 win over Brisbane Broncos, the club's 15th win from 17 matches between the clubs since 2011. 
 16 June – Ending speculation of a potential move to Brisbane, coach Craig Bellamy re-signs with the club until the end of the 2021 season.
 Round 16 – A last-minute field goal from Cameron Smith hands Melbourne a 9–8 win over the Sydney Roosters at the Adelaide Oval in the first meeting against former Storm halfback Cooper Cronk. Patrick Kaufusi made his first grade debut for the Storm, the third Kaufusi brother to play for the club.
 3 July – Ryan Hoffman announces that the 2018 season will be his last in rugby league, after playing over 300 games.
 Round 17 – Missing players through injury and Origin selection, Melbourne score four tries in the last 15 minutes to over power the Dragons in a high scoring game 52–30. All seven players members of the Storm's backline scored tries, a feat last achieved by the club against the Gold Coast Titans in 2007. Albert Vete makes his club debut after transferring from the New Zealand Warriors earlier in the week, while Christian Welch played his 50th game.
 Round 18 – With Craig Bellamy opting to rest Origin representatives against Manly, the Sea Eagles jump to a 12–0 lead, before Melbourne score a late penalty goal to take a 14–13 win.
 Round 19 – Melbourne Storm defeat the New Zealand Warriors 12–6 in Auckland, with the sending the Storm to first place on the NRL ladder for the first time in 2018.
 Round 20 – Storm's winning run extends to eight matches with a 44–10 win over Canberra Raiders, with Jahrome Hughes impressing at halfback.
 Round 21 – South Sydney Rabbitohs end Melbourne's win streak, taking a 30–20 win at ANZ Stadium. Melbourne had led 16–12 at half time, but the Rabbitohs' took the points and top spot on the NRL ladder with a dominant second half.
 8 August – Billy Slater announces that he will retire from rugby league at the end of the 2018 NRL season
 Round 22 – A second straight defeat, falling 17–14 to the Sharks at AAMI Park. Craig Bellamy was quoted after the match as saying the team lacked hunger.
 Round 24 - Storm defeat the Titans 10–8 to move to outright first on the NRL ladder.
 Round 25 - Melbourne are defeated 22–16 by the Penrith Panthers in the Panthers first ever win at AAMI Park and their first win in Melbourne since 2005. The game marked Scott Drinkwater's NRL debut, with the young fullback also scoring his first try. The loss for Melbourne saw the club finish the season on 34 competition points, creating NRL history, as due to other results, all teams in the top four finished equal on 34 points ensuring the closest finish to a season for the first time in the game's 111 year history. Melbourne would finish in second position behind the Roosters due to an inferior points difference.
 Qualifying final – In a quality contest, a field goal in the final five minutes from Cameron Munster sees Melbourne seal a 29–28 win over South Sydney at AAMI Park to progress to the preliminary finals. Doubles to Suliasi Vunivalu and Cheyse Blair helping Melbourne to the club's 15th straight win over South Sydney in Victoria.
 14 September – Cameron Smith agrees to a one-year contract extension to the end of the 2019 NRL season.
 Preliminary final – Melbourne advance to a third straight NRL Grand Final appearance, ending the Sharks season with a 22–6 win. In a man of the match display, Billy Slater scored two tries but was also charged with a grade one shoulder charge when trying to stop Sharks winger Sosaia Feki from scoring, an offence that could see him miss the Grand Final.
 25 September – Billy Slater is cleared by the NRL Judiciary panel after a lengthy hearing.
 Grand Final – Despite playing with a serious shoulder injury, former Storm player Cooper Cronk leads the Sydney Roosters to a 21–6 victory in the Grand Final. Cameron Munster was sin binned for a professional foul in the first half with the Roosters scoring not long after to lead 18–0. The Storm fell victims to their own errors and the intensity of the Roosters defence, with Munster sin binned for a second time late in the game to become the first player sin binned twice in a Grand Final. 
 1 October – Victorian Minister for Sport John Eren announces that Cameron Smith and Billy Slater will be honoured with statues outside AAMI Park.

Milestone games

Fixtures

Pre-season 

1 Match played behind closed doors.
2 Storm players that did not play in the World Club Challenge played the Trial game.

Regular season

Source:

 GP = Golden Point Extra Time
 (pen) = Penalty Try

Finals

Ladder

Coaching staff
 Craig Bellamy - Head Coach
 Adam O’Brien - Assistant Coach
 Jason Ryles - Assistant Coach
 Ben Jack - U/20s Head Coach
 Marc Brentnall – Development Coach
 Aaron Bellamy – Development Coach
 Frank Ponissi - Football Director
 Nick Maxwell - Leadership Coach
 Craig McRae – Kicking & Catching Coach
 Scott Sipple - Easts Tigers Feeder Club Coach
 Craig Ingebrigtsen - Sunshine Coast Falcons Feeder Club Coach

2018 Squad
List current as of 23 March 2018

Player movements
Source:

Losses
 Jesse Arthars to South Sydney Rabbitohs
 Cooper Cronk to Sydney Roosters
 Charlie Galo to Released
 Slade Griffen to Newcastle Knights
 Tohu Harris to New Zealand Warriors
 Jeremy Hawkins to Released
 Vincent Leuluai to South Sydney Rabbitohs
 Jordan McLean to North Queensland Cowboys
 Nate Myles to Retired
 Mark Nicholls to South Sydney Rabbitohs
 Robbie Rochow to Wests Tigers
 Young Tonumaipea to Released Religious Missionary (mid season)
 Jake Turpin to Released

Gains

 Sandor Earl from Unattached
 Tom Eisenhuth from Penrith Panthers (mid season)
 Ryan Hoffman from New Zealand Warriors
 Cooper Johns from Manly Sea Eagles
 Sam Kasiano from Canterbury Bankstown Bulldogs
 Patrick Kaufusi from North Queensland Cowboys
 Kayleb Milne from New Zealand Rugby Union
 Ryan Papenhuyzen from Wests Tigers
 Marion Seve from Brisbane Broncos (mid season)
 Billy Walters from Eastern Suburbs Tigers
 Albert Vete from New Zealand Warriors (mid season)

Representative honours
The following players have played a first grade representative match in 2018. (C) = Captain

Squad statistics 
Statistics Source:
Statistics current as of the end of the 2018 NRL regular season (this table does not include finals matches)

Scorers

Most Points in a Game: 18 points 

 Round 8: Cameron Smith (9 Goals) vs. New Zealand Warriors

Most tries in a Game: 3 

 Round 9: Josh Addo-Carr vs. St. George Illawarra Dragons

Winning Games

Highest score in a winning game: 52 points

 Round 17: vs. St. George Illawarra Dragons

Lowest score in a winning game: 7 points

 Round 12: vs. North Queensland Cowboys

Greatest winning margin: 40 points

 Round 8: vs. New Zealand Warriors

Greatest number of Games won consecutively: 8

 Round 12 to Round 20

Losing Games

Highest score in a losing game: 20 points

 Round 21: vs. South Sydney Rabbitohs

Lowest score in a losing game: 4 points

 Round 4: vs. Cronulla Sharks
 Round 11: vs. Manly Sea Eagles

Greatest losing margin: 20 points

 Round 9: vs. St. George Illawarra Dragons
 Round 11: vs. Manly Sea Eagles

Greatest number of Games lost consecutively: 2

 Round 4 to Round 5
 Round 20 to Round 21

Jerseys
Home
On 1 November 2017 the Storm revealed their new 2018 Home jersey  which is once again produced by ISC. The new jersey is a tribute to the original jersey worn by Storm during its inaugural 1998 season. It has been produced to celebrate and acknowledge the history of the club as it celebrates its 20th anniversary throughout 2018. The signature ‘V’ representing Victoria returns although is more of a traditional V rather than the style used on the original jersey and it is showcased by the heritage colours of purple and white, while the iconic purple also features around the edging of the sleeves. The popular yellow returns with trimming around the neck a throwback to the late 90s when i featured as part of the collar. Purple lightning bolts also sit on either side of the jersey. Navy has been made the primary colour to commemorate the original Storm jerseys worn during the Club's formative years.
On the front of the Jersey is the new Storm logo that was revealed on Monday as part of a launch of the 20-year celebrations. This logo is a temporary logo for the duration of the 20 year celebrations.

Away
On 3 November 2017 the club revealed the new 20th Anniversary away jersey  The away jersey is another tribute to the past with the club's iconic lightning bolts watermarked on the front of the jersey. The heritage colour of navy also features on the all white jersey, with horizontal stripes running across the bolts. Purple appears around the edging of the sleeves, identical to the home jersey. The away jersey was worn on nine occasions in 2018 (Rounds 7, 12, 15-16, 18-19, 21, 24, and the 2018 NRL Grand Final). A variation of the away jersey was worn in Round 19 due to restrictions on gambling advertising in New Zealand.

Special
On 24 January 2018 the club released a special jersey that was worn in the 2018 World Club Challenge. The jersey was the same design worn in the 2017 NRL Auckland Nines competition, with the new logos featuring on the front.

During the season Melbourne Melbourne Storm wore the following additional alternate jerseys:
 A version of their home jersey with a red "Poppy" chevron to commemorate ANZAC Day (Round 8)
 An Indigenous jersey design (Round 10)
 A 20th anniversary design similar to the 1999 jersey, with players names subliminated into the design (Round 17)
 A mostly purple with pink accents version of the home jersey to celebrate women in rugby league (Round 22)

Awards

Trophy Cabinet
2018 World Club Challenge Trophy
 2018 Michael Moore Trophy

Melbourne Storm Awards Night
Held at Peninsula Docklands, Melbourne on Thursday 3 October.
 Melbourne Storm Player of the Year: Cameron Munster
 Billy Slater Rookie of the Year: Brandon Smith
 Melbourne Storm Members' Player of Year: Cameron Munster
 Melbourne Storm Most Improved: Christian Welch
 Melbourne Storm Best Back: Billy Slater
 Melbourne Storm Best Forward: Dale Finucane
 Cooper Cronk Feeder Club Player of the Year: Scott Drinkwater
 Darren Bell U20s Player of the Year: Trent Toelau
 U20s Best Back:
 U20s Best Forward:
 Greg Brentnall Young Achievers Award: Haele Finau
 Mick Moore Club Person of the Year: Matthew Barradeen
 Life Member Inductee: Jesse Bromwich, Adam O’Brien, John Donohue
 Chairman's Award: Ashley Tucker
 Best Try: Josh Addo-Carr, Round 8 v Warriors

Dally M Awards Night
Held at Overseas Passenger Terminal, Sydney on Wednesday 26 September 2018.
 Dally M Captain of the Year: Cameron Smith
 Dally M Five-Eighth of the Year: Cameron Munster

Rugby League Players’ Association Awards Night
 RLPA Five-Eighth of the Year: Cameron Munster
 RLPA Prop of the Year: Nelson Asofa-Solomona

Additional Awards
 I Don't Quit Iron Bar:
 World Club Challenge Medal: Nelson Asofa-Solomona
 Spirit of ANZAC Medal: Billy Slater
 Wally Lewis Medal: Billy Slater
 QRL Ron McAuliffe Medal: Billy Slater
 Queensland Cup Team of the Year: Scott Drinkwater (Fullback); Billy Walters (Five-eighth); Patrick Kaufusi (Second row)

Notes

References

Melbourne Storm seasons
Melbourne Storm season